James Measures (born 14 April 1939) is an English former professional rugby league footballer who played in the 1950s and 1960s.

Background
Measures was born in St. Helens, Lancashire, England.

Playing career

International honours
Jim Measures won caps for Great Britain while at Widnes in 1963 against Australia (2 matches).

Challenge Cup Final appearances
Jim Measures played left-, i.e number 11, in Widnes' 13-5 victory over Hull Kingston Rovers in the 1964 Challenge Cup Final during the 1963–64 season at Wembley Stadium, London on Saturday 9 May 1964, in front of a crowd of 84,488.

Genealogical information
Jim Measures is the father of rugby league  who played in the 1990s for St. Helens Colts, and A-Team, Leigh and Widnes Vikings; Neil Measures.

References

External links
!Great Britain Statistics at englandrl.co.uk (statistics currently missing due to not having appeared for both Great Britain, and England)
Profile at saints.org.uk
Statistics at rugby.widnes.tv

1939 births
Living people
English rugby league players
Great Britain national rugby league team players
Rochdale Hornets players
Rugby league players from St Helens, Merseyside
Rugby league second-rows
St Helens R.F.C. players
Widnes Vikings players